An All-American team is an honorary sports team composed of the best amateur players of a specific season for each team position—who in turn are given the honorific "All-America" and typically referred to as "All-American athletes", or simply "All-Americans".  Although the honorees generally do not compete together as a unit, the term is used in U.S. team sports to refer to players who are selected by members of the national media.  Walter Camp selected the first All-America team in the early days of American football in 1889.  The 2015 NCAA Men's Basketball All-Americans are honorary lists that include All-American selections from the Associated Press (AP), the United States Basketball Writers Association (USBWA), the Sporting News (TSN), and the National Association of Basketball Coaches (NABC) for the 2014–15 NCAA Division I men's basketball season.  All selectors choose at least a first and second 5-man team. The NABC, TSN and AP choose third teams, while AP also lists honorable mention selections.

The Consensus 2015 College Basketball All-American team is determined by aggregating the results of the four major All-American teams as determined by the National Collegiate Athletic Association (NCAA).  Since United Press International was replaced by TSN in 1997, the four major selectors have been the aforementioned ones.  AP has been a selector since 1948, NABC since 1957 and USBWA since 1960.  To earn "consensus" status, a player must win honors based on a point system computed from the four different all-America teams. The point system consists of three points for first team, two points for second team and one point for third team. No honorable mention or fourth team or lower are used in the computation.  The top five totals plus ties are first team and the next five plus ties are second team.

Although the aforementioned lists are used to determine consensus honors, there are numerous other All-American lists.  The ten finalists for the John Wooden Award are described as Wooden All-Americans. The ten finalists for the Senior CLASS Award are described as Senior All-Americans.  Other All-American lists include those determined by USA Today, Fox Sports, and Yahoo! Sports.  The scholar-athletes selected by College Sports Information Directors of America (CoSIDA) are termed Academic All-Americans.

2015 Consensus All-America team
PG – Point guard
SG – Shooting guard
PF – Power forward
SF – Small forward
C – Center

Individual All-America teams

By team

AP Honorable Mention:

Lawrence Alexander, North Dakota State
Justin Anderson, Virginia
Ryan Arcidiacono, Villanova
Ron Baker, Wichita State
Jalen Cannon, St. Francis Brooklyn
Karl Cochran, Wofford
Kyle Collinsworth, BYU
Quinn Cook, Duke
Kris Dunn, Providence
Perry Ellis, Kansas
Rico Gathers, Baylor
Madarious Gibbs, Texas Southern
Anthony Gill, Virginia
Kendall Gray, Delaware State
Ty Greene, USC Upstate
Olivier Hanlan, Boston College
Montrezl Harrell, Louisville
Martez Harrison, UMKC
Tyler Harvey, Eastern Washington
Corey Hawkins, UC Davis
Tyler Haws, BYU
LaDontae Henton, Providence
Darrun Hilliard, Villanova
R. J. Hunter, Georgia State
Stanley Johnson, Arizona
Tyus Jones, Duke
Tyler Kalinoski, Davidson
Tim Kempton Jr., Lehigh
David Laury, Iona
Damon Lynn, NJIT
Derrick Marks, Boise State
Jarell Martin, LSU
T. J. McConnell, Arizona
Mikh McKinney, Sacramento State
Nic Moore, SMU
Saah Nimley, Charleston Southern
Cameron Payne, Murray State
Chasson Randle, Stanford
Justin Sears, Yale
Speedy Smith, Louisiana Tech
Keifer Sykes, Green Bay
Marcus Thornton, William & Mary
Melo Trimble, Maryland
Fred VanVleet, Wichita State
Thomas Walkup, Stephen F. Austin
Jameel Warney, Stony Brook
Dez Wells, Maryland
Joe Young, Oregon

Academic All-Americans
On February 26, 2015, CoSIDA and Capital One announced the 2015 Academic All-America team, with Matt Townsend headlining the University Division as the men's college basketball Academic All-American of the Year.  The following is the 2014–15 Capital One Academic All-America Men’s Basketball Team (University Division) as selected by CoSIDA:

Senior All-Americans
The ten finalists for the Senior CLASS Award are called Senior All-Americans.  The 10 honorees are as follows:

References

All-Americans
NCAA Men's Basketball All-Americans